Hayes Corners, Ontario can mean:

Hayes Corners, Leeds and Grenville United Counties, Ontario
Hayes Corners, Parry Sound District, Ontario